Fish fingers (British English) or fish sticks (American English) are a processed food made using a whitefish, such as cod, hake, haddock, shark or pollock, which has been battered or breaded. They are commonly available in the frozen food section of supermarkets. They can be baked in an oven, grilled, shallow fried, or deep-fried.

History
The term "fish finger" is first referenced in a recipe given in a popular British magazine in 1900, and the dish is often considered symbolic of the United Kingdom.

The food restrictions during and after WWII expanded the consumption of fish fingers, but companies struggled to maintain decent quality. The commercialization of fish fingers may be traced to 1953 when the American company Gorton-Pew Fisheries, now known as Gorton's, was the first company to introduce a frozen ready-to-cook fish finger; the product, named Gorton's Fish Sticks, won the Parents magazine Seal of Approval in 1956. The developer of those fish sticks was Aaron L. Brody.

There was an abundance of herring in the United Kingdom after World War II. Clarence Birdseye test-marketed herring fish fingers, a product he had discovered in the United States, under the name "herring savouries". These were tested in Southampton and South Wales against "cod fingers", a comparatively bland product used as a control. Shoppers, however, confounded expectations by showing an overwhelming preference for the cod. The snack was nearly called Battered Cod Pieces, until a poll of Birds Eye workers opted for the snappier Fish Fingers.

Fish fingers, specifically the pairing of them with custard, was featured in the Doctor Who episode "The Eleventh Hour".

Varieties

Minced fish comes in industry standard 7.5 kg frozen blocks for further slicing and battering. These are more commonly used in store brand economy products. They may have either batter or breadcrumbs around the outside as casing, although the coating is normally breadcrumbs.

In addition to white fish, fish fingers are sometimes made with salmon.

See also
 
 Crab stick
 Chicken fingers
 Chicken nugget
 Fishcake
 Fish finger sandwich

References

Bibliography

External links

British cuisine
Canadian cuisine
Fish dishes
Fast food
Deep fried foods
British seafood dishes
Frozen food
American seafood dishes